Pravin Mishra (born 1975) is an Indian filmmaker, painter, and newspaper columnist based in the city of Ahmedabad in Western India.

His animated short film "Dharamveer" won the national critics award at the Mumbai International Film Festival (MIFF) in 2004. In the wake of the 2018 MeToo movement, journalist Surabhi Vaya accused Mishra of sexual assault. At that time, Mishra headed a course at MICA, a business school in Ahmedabad. In 2019, Mishra filed a defamation case worth Rs. 10 crore against Vaya. He has since left his position at MICA and currently serves as the Dean at School of Design at VijayBhoomi University in Greater Mumbai.

Background and education
He was born the youngest of six siblings in Murshidabad, West Bengal in India. He painted number-plates of vehicles and billboards during his school days.

He obtained a bachelor's degree from the Government College of Art & Craft at the University of Calcutta and later received a post-graduate degree in Animation Film Design from the National Institute of Design in Ahmedabad.

Films
His first film was an animated short called Dharamveer, which addressed the issue of communal violence against the backdrop of Gujarat in 2002. This film was his diploma project at NID.
His next film Azadnagar & Gulamnagar, about bonded laborers in India, won the best short film at the Ahmedabad International Film Festival.

He also directed the music video for Indian ghazal singer Jagjit Singh's song "Ye Kaisi Aazadi Hai," which is about the right to social security in India.

His film The Killing Fields of Gujarat is about the politics of fake police encounters in the state of Gujarat.

Art exhibits
His solo exhibitions were held at the Hutheesing Visual Art Centre in Ahmedabad., Visual Art Gallery in New Delhi and Epicentre in Gurugram.

In 2010, CNN-IBN profiled him in its series on vision for India 2020.

Along with a group of his students he created a mural on a wall in Ahmedabad depicting the city's diversity.

He conducts art workshops in design schools across India.

Pravin was an Associate Professor and Director of the Crafting Creative Communication (CCC) program at MICA, Ahmedabad.

Politics
In 2007, he ran for the position of Member of the Legislative Assembly (MLA) in Gujarat from Maninagar against the incumbent Narendra Modi.

Writing
Pravin was a weekly columnist for the Ahmedabad Mirror from June 2010 to October 2014. He has written for the Times of India, The Quint and ThePrint.

References

External links
Dharamveer: https://www.youtube.com/watch?v=WT9tQE-Qb4Q
Ye kaisi Aazad Hai: http://www.cultureunplugged.com/documentary/watch-online/filmedia/play/2100/Ye-Kaisi-Aazadi-Hai-

1975 births
Living people
Indian filmmakers
Indian male painters
Indian male journalists
Government College of Art & Craft alumni
University of Calcutta alumni
National Institute of Design alumni
Painters from West Bengal